Rafael de Cabo is a Spanish scientist and Branch Chief of the Translational Gerontology Branch at the  National Institute on Aging, a division of the U.S. National Institutes of Health. His research on calorie restriction in rhesus macaques suggested that calorie restriction in monkeys have no significant effects on their lifespan. In 2011, his research on obese mice suggested that resveratrol mimetic helps extend longevity and his research on male mice suggested that metformin have a longevity effect.

References

External links
NIA Official website

Year of birth missing (living people)
Living people
Place of birth missing (living people)
American scientists
National Institutes of Health people